Fleming, Kentucky, may refer to:

 Fleming County, Kentucky, with its seat at Flemingsburg
 Fleming, one of the predecessor town of Fleming-Neon, Kentucky